The Beatles' 1965 tour of the United Kingdom was a concert tour that took place between 3 and 12 December 1965, comprising 18 shows at nine venues across England, Scotland and Wales. It coincided with the release of the Beatles' studio album Rubber Soul and their double A-side single "Day Tripper" / "We Can Work It Out", and was the final UK tour undertaken by the band. Weary of Beatlemania, the group conceded to do the tour but refused to also perform a season of Christmas concerts as they had done over the 1963–64 and 1964–65 Christmas seasons.

Background and repertoire
Whereas the venues for the Beatles' summer 1965 tour of the United States had been arenas and large auditoriums, their UK concerts were all held in theatres and cinemas. The Beatles rehearsed thoroughly for the tour; according to George Harrison's comments to the NME, their ensemble playing was also helped by their having just finished an intensive period of recording for Rubber Soul. The album marked a significant progression from the band's Merseybeat roots, furthering the musical direction they had first adopted with their late 1964 release, Beatles for Sale. For the first time in their setlist for a tour, they now eschewed any songs from before the Beatles for Sale era. The band chose their 1964 hit "I Feel Fine", sung by John Lennon, to open the shows, while their closing song, Paul McCartney's "I'm Down", became what NME journalist Alan Smith later described as "the 1965 'Twist And Shout'".

Typically for the 1960s, the UK concerts were arranged in a package-tour format, with multiple acts on the bill and two performances held each day. The support acts on the program were the Moody Blues, the Paramounts, Beryl Marsden, Steve Aldo, the Koobas, and the Marionettes. At £1000 per engagement, the Beatles' fee was the highest paid to a performing act in Britain up to that time.

The group's preparation ended with a rehearsal on 1 December at the London flat shared by Neil Aspinall and Mal Evans – the Beatles' long-serving road managers and roadies. Aside from the four band members and their manager, Brian Epstein, the tour personnel comprised only Aspinall, Evans, press officer Tony Barrow and a chauffeur, Alf Bicknell. On the way to Scotland for the first show, Harrison's Gretsch Country Gentleman fell from the group's car and into the path of a truck, destroying the instrument and leaving him with two guitars for the tour.

Tour history

The opening shows took place at the Odeon Cinema in Glasgow on 2 December. In his feature article covering the first four stops on the itinerary – Glasgow, Newcastle, Liverpool and Manchester – Smith reported that while the fans' reaction did not seem as wild as it had been in previous years, "it's been capacity audiences, screaming [fans] and better-than-ever performances by the group all the way." Part of the reason for the less-frenzied mood surrounding the tour, Smith said, was due to a heavy police presence, which meant that roads around the venues were closed off and crowd numbers were confined to only those attending the concerts.

The Beatles returned to their hometown of Liverpool on 5 December to play at the Empire Theatre, with their friends and family members among the audience. At the second show that evening, McCartney accompanied the Koobas (on drums) during their performance of "Dizzy Miss Lizzy". Otherwise, McCartney expressed disappointment at the level of police protection, saying: "just lately it's getting ridiculous. There are so many of them about, it ruins the whole atmosphere of enjoyment." 

The winter weather hindered the band's progress throughout the tour. In Glasgow, Epstein was forced to change their accommodation to an inner-city hotel, to ensure that the Beatles made it on stage. Travel was affected by snow on the roads around Newcastle, by dense fog in Manchester, and by heavy rain on the way to Birmingham. At the first performance at that city's Odeon Cinema, the Moody Blues extended their set to cover for the Beatles' late arrival.

The Beatles played the first of two London venues, the Hammersmith Odeon, on 10 December – the day the NME announced that its readers had voted them Best British Group and Best World Group for 1965. In the same poll, Lennon won in the "British Vocal Personality" category. The following day, Melody Maker listed Rubber Soul at number 1 on its national albums chart.

The 11 December concerts, at the Astoria in Finsbury Park, north London, received what author Barry Miles later described as a "tremendous" reception. Retracting his earlier statement about the growing maturity of the group's fans, Smith wrote: "I have not seen hysteria like this at a Beatles show since the word Beatlemania erupted into headlines … George Harrison staggered off the stage soaking in perspiration as he told me: 'This is one of the most incredible shows we've done. Not just because of the audience, but because they're Londoners!'" Lennon elaborated: "We used to think Londoners had that cool we've-seen-it-all-before outlook but we take it all back!"

The tour ended on 12 December with two performances at the Capitol Cinema in Cardiff. Some 25,000 applications were received for the 5000 tickets. These shows proved to be the final UK concerts the Beatles played outside London, where they went on to perform for the last time at the NME Poll-Winners' Concert in May 1966.

Set list
According to Walter Everett (lead singers appear in parenthesis):
"I Feel Fine" (John Lennon)
"She's a Woman" (Paul McCartney)
"If I Needed Someone" (George Harrison)
"Act Naturally" (Ringo Starr)
"Nowhere Man" (Lennon, with McCartney and Harrison)
"Baby's in Black" (Lennon and McCartney)
"Help!" (Lennon)
"We Can Work It Out" (McCartney)
"Yesterday" (McCartney)
"Day Tripper" (Lennon and McCartney)
"I'm Down" (McCartney)

Tour dates
According to Barry Miles and Walter Everett:

See also
 List of the Beatles' live performances

References

Sources

 
 
 
 
 
 
 
 
 

1965 concert tours
1965 UK
1965 in the United Kingdom
Concert tours of the United Kingdom
December 1965 events in the United Kingdom